William Knibb is a 2-member ward within Kettering Borough Council, created by boundary changes that took effect in 2007, having been carved out of part of the former St. Mary's ward in Kettering town. The ward was named after William Knibb, Baptist missionary in Jamaica, and covers the town centre as well as the area around Mill Road just east of the centre. It was fought at Borough Council level on Thursday 3 May 2007, at which both seats were won by Labour.

Kenneth Jack famously handed out many moons ago.

The current councillors are Cllr. Kirsty Watts and Cllr. Michael Scrimshaw.

Councillors
Kettering Borough Council Elections 2007
Keli Watts (Labour)
David Bishop (Labour)

Current Ward Boundaries (2007-)

Kettering Borough Council Elections 2007
Note: due to boundary changes, vote changes listed below are based on notional results.

See also
Kettering
Kettering Borough Council

Electoral wards in Kettering